Warner Bros. Pictures is an American film production and distribution company of the Warner Bros. Pictures Group division of Warner Bros. Entertainment (both ultimately owned by Warner Bros. Discovery). The studio is the flagship producer of live-action feature films within the Warner Bros. Pictures Group unit, and is based at the Warner Bros. Studios complex in Burbank, California. Animated films produced by the Warner Animation Group are also released under the studio banner.

Warner Bros. Pictures is currently one of five live-action film studios within the Warner Bros. Pictures Group, the others being New Line Cinema, DC Studios, Castle Rock Entertainment, and Spyglass Media Group. The final installment of the Harry Potter film series is the studio's highest-grossing film worldwide with $1.3 billion.

Founded in 1923 by brothers Harry Warner, Albert Warner, Sam Warner, and Jack L. Warner, in addition to producing its own films, it handles filmmaking operations, theatrical distribution, marketing and promotion for films produced and released by other Warner Bros. labels, including Warner Animation Group, New Line Cinema, DC Studios, and Castle Rock Entertainment. as well as various third-party producers.

History 

The studio's predecessor (and the modern-day Warner Bros Entertainment as a whole) was founded as the Warner Features Company in New Castle, Pennsylvania, by filmmaker Sam Warner and his business partners and brothers, Harry, Albert, and Jack, in 1911. They produced their first film, the Peril of the Plains in 1912, which Sam directed for the St. Louis Motion Picture Company. In 1915, Sam and Jack moved to California to establish their production studio, while Albert and Harry on July 8, 1915, set up the New York-based Warner Brothers Distributing Corporation to release the films. In 1918, the four Warner Brothers produced their first full-scale picture: My Four Years in Germany. The war film was a box office hit and helped the brothers establish themselves as a prestige studio.

On April 4, 1923, Warner Bros. Pictures, Inc. was officially established as their main focus was entirely on the motion picture industry. In 1927, Warner Bros. Pictures revolutionized the film industry when the American-Jewish Warner brothers released their first pictures "talkie" The Jazz Singer starring Al Jolson. However, founding member Sam Warner died prior to the premiere of the film. When the company diversified over the years, it was eventually rebranded to its current umbrella name, but Warner Bros. Pictures continued to be used as the name of the film production arm of the company.

In November 1966, Jack gave in to advancing age and changing times, selling 32% of control of the studio and music business to Seven Arts Productions, run by Canadian investors Elliot and Kenneth Hyman, for $32 million. Eventually, the company, including the studio, was renamed Warner Bros.-Seven Arts on July 14, 1967.

Warner Bros. Pictures 

The division was incorporated as Warner Bros. Pictures on March 3, 2003, to diversify film subjects and expand audiences for their film releases. The company became part of the Warner Bros. Pictures Group, which was established in 2008, and Jeff Robinov was appointed the first president of the company. In 2017, longtime New Line executive Toby Emmerich joined as president. In January 2018, he was elevated to chairman. On October 23, 2018, it was announced Lynne Frank, President of Warner Bros. Pictures Group, would be leaving the company to pursue new opportunities. In June 2019, Warner Bros. Pictures signed an agreement with SF Studios to have their films distributed in Sweden, Denmark, Norway, and Finland.

As with most other film distributors, Warner Bros. Pictures struggled with releasing films during the 2020 COVID-19 pandemic due to restrictions on theater openings. After pushing several films planned for 2020 into 2021, WB announced in December 2020 that they would take the unusual approach of having their entire slate of 2021 films planned for both theatrical release as well as having a simultaneous one-month period of availability on the HBO Max streaming service, in a similar manner for how they were releasing Wonder Woman 1984 that month. After one month, such films would still be available in theaters and would then later be available via home media under typical release schedules. The move to include streaming, dubbed "Project Popcorn", was criticized by production companies, directors, and actors as Warner Bros. Pictures had not informed anyone about the plan ahead of the announcement, as well of concerns of lower payouts due to the streaming options, leading Warner Bros. Pictures to alter its compensation rates for the affected films by January 2021 to provide larger payouts to casts and crews of these films.

In March 2021 Warner Bros. announced that for 2022 they will discontinue their same-day HBO Max and theatrical release model in favor of a 45-day theatrical exclusivity window. This is part of an agreement the studio reached with Cineworld (who operates Regal Cinemas).

On June 1, 2022, Warner Bros. Discovery (WBD), the company formed out of the merger of WarnerMedia and Discovery, Inc., announced that Emmerich will step down as head of the Warner Bros. Pictures Group after a transition period, and that it would be divided into three separate units; Warner Bros. Pictures/New Line Cinema, DC Films, and Warner Animation Group. Former MGM executives Michael De Luca and Pamela Abdy would serve as the co-chairs of Warner Bros. Pictures (and temporarily oversee the other two divisions until new executives are hired for them), while Emmerich would start his own production company and enter into a five-year distribution and funding agreement with Warner Bros. Pictures. On June 8, COO Carolyn Blackwood announced that she was stepping down as well.

Steve Spira returned as president of business affairs for Warner Bros. in June 2022, while De Luca and Abdy took over from Emmerich in July 2022. Former president Alan Horn was appointed as a consultant for WBD President David Zaslav, working with De Luca and Abdy.

In August 2022, Warner Bros. Pictures entered into a multi-year deal for distributing MGM films outside the United States, including on home entertainment. The contract included joint participation of both companies for marketing, advertising, publicity, film distribution, and relationship with exhibitors for future MGM titles. That same month, plans for film distribution at the studio were changed, with the studio relying more on theatrical releases than HBO Max-only releases. 

Walter Hamada, the president of DC Films, stepped down on October 19, 2022. President of Production & Development Courtenay Valenti exited on October 28 and was replaced by Jesse Ehrman.

Film library

Acquired libraries 

Mergers and acquisitions have helped Warner Bros. accumulate a diverse collection of films, cartoons and television programs. As of 2022, Warner Bros. owned more than 145,000 hours of programming, including 12,500 feature films and 2,400 television programs comprising more than tens of thousands of individual episodes.

In the aftermath of the 1948 antitrust suit, uncertain times led Warner Bros. in 1956 to sell most of its pre-1950 films and cartoons to Associated Artists Productions (a.a.p.). In addition, a.a.p. also obtained the Fleischer Studios and Famous Studios Popeye cartoons, originally from Paramount Pictures. Two years later, a.a.p. was sold to United Artists, which owned the company until 1981, when Metro-Goldwyn-Mayer acquired United Artists.

In 1982, during their independent years, Turner Broadcasting System acquired Brut Productions, the film production arm of France-based then-struggling personal-care company Faberge Inc.

In 1986, Turner Broadcasting System acquired Metro-Goldwyn-Mayer. Finding itself in debt, Turner kept the pre-May 1986 MGM film and television libraries and a small portion of the United Artists library (including the a.a.p. library and North American rights to the RKO Radio Pictures library) while spinning off the rest of MGM.

In 1989, Warner Communications acquired Lorimar-Telepictures Corporation and merged with Time Inc. to form Time Warner (now Warner Bros. Discovery. Lorimar's catalogue included the post-1974 library of Rankin/Bass Productions, and the post-1947 library of Monogram Pictures/Allied Artists Pictures Corporation.

In 1991, Turner Broadcasting System acquired animation studio Hanna-Barbera and the Ruby-Spears library from Great American Broadcasting, and years later, Turner Broadcasting System acquired Castle Rock Entertainment on December 22, 1993 and New Line Cinema on January 28, 1994. On October 10, 1996, Time Warner acquired Turner Broadcasting System, thus bringing Warner Bros.'s pre-1950 library back home. In addition, Warner Bros. only owns Castle Rock Entertainment's post-1994 library.

In 2008, Time Warner integrated New Line to Warner Bros.

In June 2016, it created the Harry Potter Global Franchise Development Team to oversee its ownership of the Harry Potter franchise worldwide (including the Wizarding World trademark).

The studio's first live-action film was My Four Years in Germany (1918), their first animated film was Gay Purr-ee (1962). Animated films produced by Warner Bros. Animation, and the Warner Animation Group are also released by Warner Bros. Pictures. The studio has released twenty-five films that have received an Academy Award for Best Picture nomination: Disraeli (1929), I Am a Fugitive from a Chain Gang (1932), 42nd Street (1933), Here Comes the Navy (1934), A Midsummer Night's Dream (1935), Anthony Adverse (1936), The Life of Emile Zola (1937), The Adventures of Robin Hood (1938), Four Daughters (1938), Jezebel (1938), Dark Victory (1939), to name a few.

Film series

Highest-grossing films 

‡ - include theatrical reissues

Notes 

  co-owned by New Line Cinema and Metro-Goldwyn-Mayer Pictures (the film's producers)

References

External links 
 

American brands
American companies established in 1923
Film production companies of the United States
Entertainment companies based in California
Companies based in Burbank, California
Mass media companies established in 1923
1923 establishments in California
Pictures
Film distributors of the United States
Academy Award for Technical Achievement winners